Benny Jensen (24 October 1934 – 2 June 1995) was a Danish sports shooter. He competed in the skeet event at the 1968 Summer Olympics.

References

External links
 

1934 births
1995 deaths
Danish male sport shooters
Olympic shooters of Denmark
Shooters at the 1968 Summer Olympics
People from Køge Municipality
Sportspeople from Region Zealand
20th-century Danish people